Wired 99.9FM is a college radio station in Limerick city, Ireland, licensed by the Broadcasting Authority of Ireland to serve the student population of Limerick City. It is currently run as a partnership between Mary Immaculate College and Limerick Institute of Technology. The station broadcasts all over Limerick city on 99.9FM and also streams online.

Wired FM is a member of CRAOL, the Community Radio Forum of Ireland.

History and mission statement 
The station was licensed by the Broadcasting Commission of Ireland (as the IRTC) in 1995. The station has an active policy of facilitating access, communication and participation for all third-level students to its studios which are located in Mary Immaculate College and Limerick Institute of Technology.  Wired FM's mission statement states that the station;

Programming 
Broadcasting on 99.9FM in the Limerick City area, Wired transmits 60 hours of programming every week during the academic year. The station broadcasts a wide range of programmes, including magazine shows, specialist music, student current affairs, documentaries, education programmes, arts, book and films shows. Music shows cover every genre, from ska to soul, trance to traditional, protest music to metal and always with an emphasis on local and unsigned talent.

Broadcast hours 
Wired FM currently broadcasts during term time (October to December, and January to May) from 9am to 10pm on 99.9FM with a 24-hour online stream during these days.

Staff and presenters 
The station has 2 full time members of staff, one part-time, student interns and over 120 student volunteers from TUS (which includes the Limerick School of Art and Design city campus) and MIC who produce and present all of the programmes on the station.

References

External links 
 

Radio stations in the Republic of Ireland
Culture in Limerick (city)